The Marr's Creek Bridge is a historic bridge spanning Marr's Creek in Pocahontas, Arkansas. The concrete open spandrel deck arch bridge formerly carried U.S. Route 67 (US 67), which now passes over the creek on an adjacent modern steel and concrete structure. The bridge was widened slightly at its eastern end in 1950 to accommodate a slight curve.

The bridge was listed on the National Register of Historic Places in 2008.

See also
 
 
 
 
 List of bridges on the National Register of Historic Places in Arkansas
 National Register of Historic Places listings in Randolph County, Arkansas

References

External links
Encyclopedia of Arkansas History & Culture entry

Road bridges on the National Register of Historic Places in Arkansas
Bridges completed in 1934
U.S. Route 67
Bridges of the United States Numbered Highway System
National Register of Historic Places in Randolph County, Arkansas
Concrete bridges in the United States
Open-spandrel deck arch bridges in the United States
1934 establishments in Arkansas
Public Works Administration in Arkansas
Transportation in Randolph County, Arkansas